Gérard Fauré (born 1946) is a French essayist and a former drug dealer and bank robber. He is the author of several controversial books which claim to reveal the hidden side of a number of public figures in France and Europe.

Biography 
Gérard Fauré was born in 1946 in Fez, Morocco, to a Berber mother, and a father working as a physician in the French army who also served as the personal physician to King Mohammed V of Morocco. Born in the French Protectorate in Morocco (1907–1956), Fauré holds the French citizenship.

He became involved with smuggling in Tangier after learning tricks from a member of the Italian mafia named Renato Montalbano. Fauré used – without his knowledge – the relations of his father with the custom services to work in the illicit transfer of cigarettes and whisky between Gibraltar and Morocco. In 1964, Fauré moved to Spain, where he befriended a local gang in the early 1960s, which allowed him integrate the French Milieu.

After a personal foe with Moroccan officer General Oufkir, he was forced to leave Spain for the Netherlands. There, Fauré first became involved with armed robberies, then with drug dealing. He has also claimed to have worked as an "occasional" hitman.

In 1999, Fauré was detained for the possession of 188 grams of cocaine. At the time of the arrest, he was armed with a 9mm handgun and a knife. Fauré got out the Fleury-Mérogis Prison in October 2018.

Since 2016, he has been publishing book that unveil the alleged secrets and the hidden side of political figures and the show business with whom he claims to have been involved as a drug dealer. Charges may include unrestrained use of narcotics—mainly massive doses of cocaine—, sexual abuse, rapes, including pedophilia, child molestation, trafficking of children, murders and assassinations.

Works

See also

Notes and references

References

Interviews of Fauré 

1946 births
Bank robbers
Drug dealers
French assassins
Moroccan essayists
Moroccan writers in French
20th-century French criminals